The 2003 European Junior Swimming Championships were held in Glasgow 31 July-3 August.

Medal table

Results

Boy's events

|-
| 50 m freestyle

|-
| 100 m freestyle

|-
| 200 m freestyle

|-
| 400 m freestyle

|-
| 1500 m freestyle

|-
| 50 m backstroke

|-
| 100 m backstroke

|-
| 200 m backstroke

|-
| 50 m breaststroke

|-
| 100 m breaststroke

|-
| 200 m breaststroke

|-
| 50 m butterfly

|-
| 100 m butterfly

|-
| 200 m butterfly

|-
| 200 m individual medley

|-
| 400 m individual medley

|-
|  freestyle relay

|-
|  freestyle relay

|-
|  medley relay

|}

Girl's events

|-
| 50 m freestyle

|-
| 100 m freestyle

|-
| 200 m freestyle

|-
| 400 m freestyle

|-
| 800 m freestyle

|-
| 50 m backstroke

|-
| 100 m backstroke

|-
| 200 m backstroke

|-
| 50 m breaststroke

|-
| 100 m breaststroke

|-
| 200 m breaststroke

|-
| 50 m butterfly

|-
| 100 m butterfly

|-
| 200 m butterfly

|-
| 200 m individual medley

|-
| 400 m individual medley

|-
|  freestyle relay

|-
|  freestyle relay

|-
|  medley relay

|}

J
S
European Junior Swimming Championships
July 2003 sports events in the United Kingdom
Swimming
International aquatics competitions hosted by the United Kingdom
International sports competitions in Glasgow
August 2003 sports events in the United Kingdom